Northwestern University Feinberg School of Medicine is the medical school of Northwestern University and is located in the Streeterville neighborhood of Chicago, Illinois. Founded in 1859, Feinberg offers a full-time Doctor of Medicine degree program, multiple joint degree programs, graduate medical education, and continuing medical education.

Feinberg ranked 17th among American medical schools for research by U.S. News & World Report in 2022. It also is committed to patient care and community service.  Through clinical affiliates Northwestern Memorial Hospital, the Ann & Robert H. Lurie Children's Hospital of Chicago, and the Shirley Ryan AbilityLab (formerly Rehabilitation Institute of Chicago), Feinberg faculty provide patient care to tens of thousands of individuals every year. Feinberg and its clinical affiliates are together an $11 billion academic medical enterprise. The school has 4,766 faculty members.

History
Hosmer Johnson, Nathan Smith Davis, Ralph Isham, Edmund Andrews, David Rutter and William Byford co-founded the medical department of Lind University on October 11, 1859. It was renamed the Chicago Medical College in 1863, and affiliated with Northwestern University in 1870.

The Woman’s Medical College of Chicago, established in 1870 as the Woman’s Hospital Medical College, became affiliated with Northwestern in 1892 as Northwestern University Woman’s Medical School. The college closed in 1902 as other schools in Chicago and the nation began accepting women.

In 1906, the Chicago Medical College was renamed Northwestern University Medical School. It had occupied buildings on the near south side of Chicago from 1863 until the Montgomery Ward Memorial Building was constructed in Streeterville in 1926.

Northwestern University Medical School was renamed the Feinberg School of Medicine in 2002, reflecting a $75 million donation from the Joseph and Bessie Feinberg Foundation. Reuben Feinberg started to donate to the university after being hospitalized at Northwestern Memorial Hospital for a heart attack. The first donation, in 1988, was for $17 million to establish the Feinberg Cardiovascular Research Institute. A $10 million donation was subsequently sent in 1996 to establish the Frances Evelyn Feinberg Clinical Neurosciences Institute.

On September 1, 2013, Northwestern Medical Faculty Foundation, the medical school's physician's group, joined Northwestern Memorial HealthCare (NMHC), the health system that includes Northwestern Memorial Hospital, forming a new physician's group called Northwestern Medical Group. Together, NMHC and Feinberg jointly share the brand "Northwestern Medicine."

On May 8, 2015, exactly 90 years after Northwestern University first broke ground on its Chicago campus, Feinberg broke ground on the Louis A. Simpson and Kimberly K. Querrey Biomedical Research Center. The building opened in June 2019 and added more than 625,000 square feet and 12 stories of research space to the downtown campus.

Academic Medical Center
The Feinberg School of Medicine is part of the  McGaw Medical Center of Northwestern University. Other McGaw members include:
 Anne & Robert H. Lurie Children's Hospital of Chicago
 Northwestern Memorial Hospital 
 Shirley Ryan AbilityLab (formerly Rehabilitation Institute of Chicago)
 Jesse Brown VA Medical Center (formerly VA Chicago Health Care System)

Feinberg medical students and McGaw residents receive their clinical training at these hospitals, where nearly all the attending staff members have faculty appointments at the Feinberg School of Medicine. Residents also train at affiliates such as John H. Stroger Jr Hospital of Cook County, Northwestern Medicine Lake Forest Hospital, Swedish Covenant Hospital, MacNeal Hospital, and Methodist Hospital in Gary, Indiana.

The medical school's primary teaching hospital is Northwestern Memorial Hospital, a  modern hospital that was completed in 1999.

In the 2022 U.S. News & World Report list of "Honor Roll" Hospitals, listing the top ten medical centers in the United States, Northwestern Memorial Hospital is ranked ninth, and first in Illinois and the Shirley Ryan AbilityLab was ranked first in the country for rehabilitation.

Education
The Feinberg School of Medicine is home to 657 medical students. The class of students who graduated in 2022 are the 163rd graduating class. For the 2022 entering class, 8,073 people applied for 150 seats. The median undergraduate GPA and MCAT score for successful applicants are 3.92 and 520, respectively.

In 2012, Feinberg's entering medical students began a new curriculum, organized into three phases and emphasizing integration of four main curricular elements: science in medicine, clinical medicine, health & society, and professional development. The goal of the renewal process is to build a more learner-centered educational program that (1) fully integrates scientific principles in a clinical context; (2) stimulates inquiry and investigation; (3) has an assessment system that comprehensively evaluates student achievement in each of the core competencies; (4) reinforces a culture of learning, teamwork, and excellence; (5) is flexible and able to meet the unique needs of individual students as they learn and differentiate.

For medical students, the school offers four-year dual degree programs, which combine the Doctor of Medicine (MD) degree with a Master of Public Health (MPH), a Master of Arts in Medical Humanities and Bioethics (MA), a Master of Science in Healthcare Quality and Patient Safety (MS), or a Master of Business Administration (MBA). Students electing to pursue the additional degrees enroll in evening classes and graduate with both degrees. Two MD/PhD programs are offered, one in combination with Northwestern University's Graduate School (Medical Scientist Training Program) and one with the university's Institute for Neuroscience.

The school also offers graduate degree programs, some in combination with other Northwestern University professional schools:
Doctor of Philosophy (PhD) in basic science programs such as Biological Sciences and Clinical Psychology, and public health programs such as Health and Biomedical Informatics, Health Services and Outcomes Research, Epidemiology, and Translational Outcomes Science
Doctor of Physical Therapy (DPT)
Master of Medical Science (MMSc) in Physician Assistant Studies
Master of Public Health (MPH)
Master of Science (MS) in programs such as Epidemiology and Biostatistics, Clinical Investigation, Genetic Counseling, Regulatory Compliance, or Healthcare Quality and Patient Safety
Master of Medical Informatics (MMI)
Master of Prosthetics and Orthotics (MPO)

Additionally, the school offers a BS/MD degree through the Honors Program in Medical Education (HPME), a seven-year combined undergraduate and medical school program.

Research
According to public financial data for Feinberg, support for competitive research grants from all external sources totaled $650 million in academic year 2021–2022. In 2022, Feinberg ranked 15th for NIH funding among American medical schools.  The medical school houses more than 30 Core Facilities, including a Bioinformatics Consulting Core, Genomics Core and Human Embryonic and Induced Pluripotent Stem Cell Core.

Faculty in the Research program at Feinberg study and mentor in a range of areas, including cancer biology, cell biology, chemical biology, drug discovery, developmental biology, evolutionary biology, genetics, genomics, medical biology, immunology, microbial pathogenesis, neuroscience, pharmacology, structural biology, biochemistry, epigenetics, epidemiology, behavioral sciences, preventive medicine, epidemiology, health outcomes, quality improvement, and translational sciences.

Recent Growth

In June 2019, the university opened a $560 million, 625,000 square-foot biomedical research building on the Chicago campus. The new building, the Louis A. Simpson and Kimberly K. Querrey Biomedical Research Center, is connected to the existing Robert H. Lurie Medical Research Center.  A second phase of build out will eventually total 1.2 million square feet in the new building when complete. Additionally, more than 250,000 square feet of space in existing campus buildings has been converted to new laboratory space.

Nobel Laureates
 John Eccles, an Australian neurophysiologist and philosopher, received the 1963 Nobel Prize in Physiology or Medicine with Andrew Huxley and Alan Lloyd Hodgkin for their fundamental work on the synapse. Eccles was a professor at Feinberg from 1966 to 1968. 
 Robert Furchgott, a graduate of the class of 1940, received the Nobel Prize in Physiology or Medicine in 1998 for his co-discovery of the role of nitric oxide as a signaling molecule.
 Ferid Murad, an American pharmacologist and cell biologist, received the Nobel Prize in Physiology or Medicine in 1998, along with Robert F. Furchgott and Louis J. Ignarro, for demonstrating that nitroglycerin and related drugs worked by releasing nitric oxide into the body, which relaxed smooth muscle by elevating intracellular cyclic GMP. Murad was an adjunct professor at Feinberg from 1988 to 1998.

Rankings
In 2022, Feinberg was ranked 17th among American medical research schools by U.S. News & World Report. The school is ranked 15th in the National Institutes of Health funding rankings among all American Medical Schools.

The school's major affiliated teaching hospitals rank in U.S. News & World Report's Best Hospitals 2020-2021 as follows: 
 Shirley Ryan AbilityLab, ranked first in the nation for physical medicine and rehabilitation hospitals 
 Northwestern Memorial Hospital, ranked ninth in the nation of America's Best Hospitals
 Ann & Robert H. Lurie Children's Hospital of Chicago, nationally ranked in 10 specialties

Notable alumni
 Nicholas Senn, Class of 1868, an early surgeon-scientist and founder of the Association of Military Surgeons of the United States. He was a former president of the American Medical Association in 1897.
 Mary Harris Thompson, Class of 1870, ad eundem, first female surgeon in Chicago and first female surgeon at Cook County Hospital. Founder of the Mary Thompson Hospital
 James R. Walker, Class of 1873, joined the United States Indian Service and spent his professional life caring for and describing the society and norms of the Lakota, becoming an early scholar of Indian life as reported in his book The Sun Dance and Other Ceremonies of the Oglala Division of the Teton Dakota.
 Sarah Hackett Stevenson, Class of 1874, the first female member of the American Medical Association (AMA), head of the Illinois State Medical Society's committee on progress in physiology, and a leader and advocate for the emancipation of women and for the equal treatment of men and women.
Roswell Park, Class of 1876, surgeon for whom Roswell Park Comprehensive Cancer Center in Buffalo, New York, is named
 Franklin H. Martin, Class of 1880, former Director-General of the American College of Surgeons and founding editor of Surgery, Gynecology, and Obstetrics
John Addison Fordyce, Class of 1881, American dermatologist whose name is associated with Fordyce's spot, Angiokeratoma of Fordyce, Brooke–Fordyce trichoepithelioma, Fordyce's disease, Fordyce's lesion, and Fox–Fordyce disease
Daniel Hale Williams, Class of 1883, performed the first successful pericardial heart surgery in America; only African-American charter member of the American College of Surgeons
Charles Horace Mayo, Class of 1888, founder of Mayo Clinic
Carlos Montezuma, Class of 1889, one of the first Native Americans to receive a Doctor of Medicine degree from any school, and founder of the Society of American Indians
Joseph Bolivar DeLee, Class of 1891, an American physician who became known as the father of modern obstetrics. DeLee founded the Chicago Lying-in Hospital, where he introduced the first portable infant incubator. 
Anne Hazen McFarland, Class of 1891 Woman's Medical College, physician specializing in neurology, medical journal editor
Isaac Arthur Abt, Class of 1891, among the first American physicians to specialize in pediatrics, author of the major pediatric textbook of the first decades of the 20th century
George E. Hoyt, Class of 1892, member of the Wisconsin State Assembly and the Wisconsin State Senate
George Jewett, Class of 1893, first African-American medical student who simultaneously played collegiate football in the Big 10. In his honor, the George Jewett Trophy is a rivalry trophy awarded each time Northwestern plays Michigan in football.
Emma Ann Reynolds, Class of 1895, superintendent of training at Provident Hospital Training School for Nurses, physician in residence at Paul Quinn College, and the first African American woman to receive a Doctor of Medicine degree from Northwestern University 
Howard T. Ricketts, Class of 1897, discovered bacteria of the genus Rickettsia, and identified the cause and methods of transmission of rocky mountain spotted fever
Henry Stanley Plummer, Class of 1898, internist, endocrinologist and one of the founding partners of the Mayo Clinic. Considered to be the architect of the modern medical practice. The Plummer Building on the Mayo Clinic campus was named after him, as were Plummer-Vinson Syndrome and Plummer’s nails.
Allen B. Kanavel, Class of 1899, founder, regent, and president of the American College of Surgeons, internationally recognized as founder of modern hand and peripheral nerve surgery
Julius Hess, Class of 1899, a pediatrician considered the father of American neonatology. In 1922, he published the first textbook on prematurity and birth defects, and started the first premature infant station in the United States.
Clifford G. Grulee, a pediatrician and founding member of the American Academy of Pediatrics
Loyal E. Davis, Class of 1918, American neurosurgeon, Chairman of the Department of Surgery at Northwestern University Medical School, President of the American College of Surgeons, and adoptive father of former First Lady of the United States Nancy Reagan
Theodore K. Lawless, Class of 1919, African-American dermatologist and philanthropist; advanced the treatment of leprosy and syphilis
Arthur Falls, Class of 1925, African-American physician and activist who played a major role in desegregation of Chicago's health facilities
Alfred Bitini Xuma, Class of 1926, surgeon in Johannesburg and later president (1940–49) of the African National Congress, preceding Nelson Mandela.  The first black South African to graduate from the London School of Hygiene & Tropical Medicine  (1932)
 William F. Windle, Class of 1926, 1968 winner of the Albert Lasker Basic Medical Research Award for work on brain development and injury
Eric Oldberg, Class of 1927, neurosurgeon, co-discoverer of cholecystokinin, director of neurological surgery at the University of Illinois School of Medicine (1936-1971), director of the Chicago Board of Health (1960-1979)
J. Roscoe Miller, Class of 1930, president, Northwestern University 1949–1969; dean, Northwestern University Medical School, 1941-1949
William S. Kroger, Class of 1931, pioneer in the use of hypnosis in medicine and co-founder and founder of medical societies and academies dedicated to furthering psychosomatic medicine and medical hypnosis.
Kenneth  Gieser, Class of 1934, co-founder of the Christian Medical Society, now Christian Medical and Dental Associations.
Roger W. Robinson, Class of 1935, a cardiologist who recognized the role of cholesterol and diet in atherosclerotic heart disease and later demonstrated that heparin prevents arterial clots.
George Peterson, Class of 1935, co-founder of the Christian Medical Society, now Christian Medical and Dental Associations.
John Patrick Spiegel, Class of 1939, American psychiatrist, and expert on violence and combat stress and the 103rd president of the American Psychiatric Association.
Robert F. Furchgott, Class of 1940, 1998 Nobel Prize in Physiology or Medicine for his co-discovery of nitric oxide
Cheddi Jagan, Class of 1946: President of Guyana from 1992 to 1997
Arthur DeBoer, class of 1946, American cardiologist and first in Chicago to use cardiopulmonary bypass in heart surgery
Ralph S. Paffenbarger, Class of 1947, epidemiologist, leader of the College Alumni Health Study in the 1960s, which established the health benefits of exercise, considered the father of the modern fitness movement
Quentin D. Young, Class of 1947, leader in public health policy and medical and social justice issues; founded Physicians for a National Health Program and co-founded the Medical Committee for Human Rights,
Kermit E. Krantz, Class of 1948, Distinguished University Professor of Medicine, University of Kansas. Developed the Marshall-Marchetti-Krantz (MMK) and invented the expandable tampon. Namesake of the Arey/Krantz Museum of Anatomy at the Feinberg School of Medicine.
John A. D. Cooper, Class of 1951, first president of the Association of American Medical Colleges
Thomas E. Starzl, Class of 1952, performed the first successful liver transplant in 1967 and received the National Medal of Science in 2004
Robert M. Blizzard, Class of 1952, pediatric endocrinologist and pioneer of growth hormone therapy
Robert A. Kyle, Class of 1952, hematologist who developed our modern understanding of amyloidosis and various monoclonal gammopathies
Joseph P. Kerwin, first physician in space, flew on three skylab missions and later served as director of Space and Life Sciences at NASA
Edmond I. Eger II, MD, Class of 1955, developed the potency concept of minimum alveolar concentration for anesthetic gasses. He also identified opportunities for new drugs to be used as anesthesia, including isoflurane, sevoflurane, and desflurane.
Alan R. Nelson, Class of 1958, president of the American Medical Association (1989–90) and the World Medical Association (1991–92)
Robert Michels, Class of 1958, a psychiatrist who became chairman of the Department of Psychiatry at Weill-Cornell Medical College in 1974, served as Chairman of the Payne-Whitney Psychiatric Clinic in Manhattan for 17 years, and then served as Dean and Provost at Cornell from 1991 to 1996
Myles Cunningham, Class of 1958, president of the American Cancer Society, 1997
Sandra F. Olson, Class of 1963, GME 1969,  first woman president of American Academy of Neurology, the Illinois State Medical Society, the Chicago Medical Society, and the Chicago Neurological Society
Irun Cohen, Class of 1963, immunologist at the Weizmann Institute of Science, Israel.
Joseph Silva, Class of 1966, dean, University of California–Davis School of Medicine, 1997-2005
Eugene A. Bauer, Class of 1967, vice president for medical affairs and dean, Stanford University School of Medicine, 1995-2001
 Robert F. Spetzler, Class of 1971, J.N. Harber Chairman Emeritus of Neurological Surgery and director emeritus of the Barrow Neurological Institute
Jay Perman, Class of 1972, president, University of Maryland, Baltimore, 2010 – present, dean, University of Kentucky College of Medicine, 2004-2010
 C. Richard Schlegel, Class of 1972, developed the dominant patent for a vaccine against human papillomavirus (HPV) (administered as Gardasil) to prevent cervical cancer
David J. Skorton, Class of 1974, president of the University of Iowa 2003–2006, president of Cornell University 2006–2015, secretary of the Smithsonian Institution 2015–2019 and president and CEO of the Association of American Medical Colleges 2019–present.
John R. Lumpkin, Class of 1974, country’s first African-American emergency room physician and authority on public health issues affecting patient care
Joseph A. Walder, Class of 1975, founder and CEO of Integrated DNA Technologies, the largest supplier of custom nucleic acids in the United States
Francisco González-Scarano, Class of 1975, neurologist working on the neurotropism of viruses, and former dean of the University of Texas School of Medicine at San Antonio, Texas 
Diane E. Meier, Class of 1977, American geriatrician, MacArthur Fellow, and internationally recognized expert on palliative medicine
Janet Woodcock, Class of 1977, served as interim Commissioner of the Food and Drug Administration (FDA) and Director of the Center for Drug Evaluation and Research (CDER) at the FDA
Sandra Carson, Class of 1977, principal investigator of the first artificial human ovary and former president of the American Society for Reproductive Medicine 
Steven J. Corwin, Class of 1979, president and CEO of The New York and Presbyterian Hospital
Ora Hirsch Pescovitz, Class of 1979, former executive vice president for medical affairs, University of Michigan; CEO, University of Michigan Health System, president of Oakland University
Andrew E. Senyei, Class of 1979, inventor, venture capitalist, and entrepreneur, founder of biotech and genetics companies
Deborah Asnis, Class of 1981, infectious disease specialist, discovered and reported first human cases of West Nile virus in the United States.
David J. Smith, Class of 1981, Read Admiral, joint staff surgeon/chief medical advisor to the Chairman of the Joint Chiefs of Staff; United States delegate to the North American Treaty Organization Council of Medical Directors
Boris Lushniak, Class of 1981, Rear Admiral, deputy U.S. Surgeon General
Michael Parmacek, Class of 1981, chair of the Department of Medicine, Perelman School of Medicine at the University of Pennsylvania
James P. Kelly, Class of 1983, director, National Intrepid Center of Excellence
David M. Holtzman, Class of 1985, is a distinguished neurologist known for discovering how apoE4 contributes to Alzheimer’s Disease and how synaptic activity and sleep modulates the levels of amyloid beta and tau proteins in the brain.
Peter G. Traber, Class of 1984, president, Baylor College of Medicine, 2003-2008
Michael Barratt, Class of 1985, NASA mission specialist, 2000–present; member International Space Station Expeditions 19 and 20, 2009; on final flight of Discovery 2011 STS 133.
Harold Paz, GME 1985 and 1986, vice president and dean, Penn State Hershey Medical College
Debi Thomas, Class of 1997: 1988 Olympic Figure Skating Bronze Medalist and orthopedic surgeon

References

External links
 Feinberg School of Medicine
 Northwestern Memorial Hospital

Northwestern University
Educational institutions established in 1859
Medical schools in Illinois
1859 establishments in Illinois
Northwestern Medicine
Streeterville, Chicago